Zemia Rodnô (lit. Motherland) is a Kashubian patriotic song commonly regarded as the anthem of Kashubia and its people. Its author is Jan Trepczyk, an prominent Kashubian activist, which wrote the song in 1954. The first symphonic performance was done in 2006 by the Kashubian-Pomeranian Association.

Text

Use 
Zemia Rodnô is the official anthem (or official song) of the following groups:
Pomorania Students' Club
Kashubian Choir Council
Kaszëbskô Jednota

Since 19th March 2012, Radio Kaszëbë plays the anthem at 12 am and pm.

A ceremonial version of the anthem plays during Kashubian Unity Day.

References 

European anthems
Kashubia
Kashubian culture